Power Rangers Time Force is a video game based on the 9th season of the TV series, Power Rangers Time Force released in 2001 and published by THQ. The game was released for the Game Boy Color, Game Boy Advance, Microsoft Windows, and PlayStation.

Game Boy Color version
The Game Boy Color version is a platforming side-scroller. The five Time Force rangers travel through time stopping enemies. The player can choose to play as any of the five main Time Force Rangers. The game also features Zord battles.

Game Boy Advance version
The Game Boy Advance version is a beat 'em up side-scroller. This version follows the show more closely. The player must travel through various stages to stop the evil Ransik. All five Time Force Rangers are playable in the game. The Quantum Ranger is playable when the player earns the Quantum Morpher power-up, allowing the Ranger the player is controlling to use the powers of the Quantum Ranger. The game also features Zord battles, however, only the Time Force Megazord in mode red is playable in these battles. This game is similar to the 2003 Power Rangers: Ninja Storm video game for GBA.

PlayStation version
The PlayStation version, developed by Climax Studios is a 3D action game that featured single and 2 player battles, the latter having only the Megazords and the main bosses. The player can find a Time Artifact hidden in each level, and a health bar bonus is awarded if the level is completed within the time limit. All seven artifacts must be collected to unlock the Quantum Ranger.

References

External links
Power Rangers Time Force can be played for free in the browser on the Internet Archive

2001 video games
Engine Software games
Game Boy Advance games
Game Boy Advance-only games
Game Boy Color games
Game Boy Color-only games
Natsume (company) games
PlayStation (console) games
Power Rangers Time Force
Power Rangers video games
Single-player video games
Superhero video games
THQ games
Vicarious Visions games
Video games about time travel
Video games developed in Japan
Video games developed in the United Kingdom
Video games developed in the United States
Video games featuring female protagonists
Video games scored by Iku Mizutani
Windows games